is a Filipino-Japanese volleyball player who is currently living in the Philippines. She played in the University Athletic Association of the Philippines for the NU Lady Bulldogs and is currently playing in the Premier Volleyball League for the Creamline Cool Smashers.

Early life 
Risa Sato was born on October 4, 1994 in Osaka, Japan where she also spent her childhood. Her mother is Filipino while her father is Japanese. Sato played volleyball at school in Japan. She left Japan at age 19 along with her mother to pursue her dream to play in the Philippines.

Career 
Sato was brought to the Philippines in 2013 to play for the collegiate varsity team of the Ateneo de Manila University by Roger Gorayeb, who was then coach of the university. She played for Ateneo as a guest player in the Shakey's V-League. However she failed to get admitted to Ateneo due to failing the entrance examinations which was written in English. In August 2015, she underwent try-outs to play for the National University which by that time was already being mentored by Gorayeb. By July 2017 she was already playing for the National University where she is a second year college student pursuing a degree in sports and wellness management. By the same time she was already playing for the BaliPure Purest Water Defenders of the Premier Volleyball League. She won the Premier Volleyball League 1st Season Collegiate Conference championship with NU Lady Bulldogs.

During her collegiate career, she won the following individual awards: 1st best middle blocker (2017 PVL reinforced conference), 2nd best middle blocker (2017 PVL open conference), 2nd best middle blocker (2017 PVL collegiate conference)

National team 
Sato made her international debut playing for the Philippine youth national team at the 2015 Asian Women's U23 Volleyball Championship which was hosted in Pasig. She was also part of the senior team squad that played in the 2015 VTV International Women's Volleyball Cup, an invitational tournament held in Vietnam.

Personal life 
By July 2017, Sato's mother who came with her when she moved to the Philippines had long returned to Osaka to join her dad. One of her sisters is also studying in the Philippines and she is occasionally visited by her cousins from Laguna.

Clubs 
  BaliPure Purest Water Defenders (2016–2017)
  Creamline Cool Smashers (2018-present)

Awards

Individuals 
2017 Premier Volleyball League 1st Season Reinforced Open Conference "1st Best Middle Blocker"
2017 Premier Volleyball League 1st Season Open Conference "2nd Best Middle Blocker"
2017 Premier Volleyball League 1st Season Collegiate Conference "2nd Best Middle Blocker"

Collegiate 
 Shakey's V-League 12th Season Collegiate Conference -  Silver medal, with Ateneo Lady Eagles
 Shakey's V-League 13th Season Collegiate Conference -  Champion, with NU Lady Bulldogs
 UAAP Season 77 Women's volleyball tournament  Bronze medal, with NU Lady Bulldogs
 Premier Volleyball League 1st Season Collegiate Conference -  Champion, with NU Lady Bulldogs

Clubs 
 2017 Premier Volleyball League Reinforced Conference –  Runner-up, with BaliPure Purest Water Defenders
 2017 Premier Volleyball League Open Conference –  Champion, with BaliPure Purest Water Defenders
 2018 Premier Volleyball League Reinforced Conference –  Champion, with Creamline Cool Smashers
 2018 Premier Volleyball League Open Conference –  Champion, with Creamline Cool Smashers
 2019 Premier Volleyball League Reinforced Conference –  Silver Medal, with Creamline Cool Smashers
 2019 Premier Volleyball League Open Conference –  Champions, with Creamline Cool Smashers
 2021 Premier Volleyball League Open Conference –  Silver Medal, with Creamline Cool Smashers
 2022 Premier Volleyball League Open Conference –  Champions, with Creamline Cool Smashers
 2022 Premier Volleyball League Invitational Conference –  Champions, with Creamline Cool Smashers
 2022 Premier Volleyball League Reinforced Conference -  Bronze medal, with Creamline Cool Smashers

References 

Filipino people of Japanese descent
Japanese people of Filipino descent
1994 births
Middle blockers
Sportspeople from Osaka
National University (Philippines) alumni
University Athletic Association of the Philippines volleyball players
Living people
Philippines women's international volleyball players
Filipino women's volleyball players